All-electric range (AER) is the maximum driving range of an electric vehicle using only power from its on-board battery pack to traverse a given driving cycle. In the case of an all-electric vehicle, it means the maximum range per recharge. For a plug-in hybrid electric vehicle (PHEV), it means the maximum range in charge-depleting mode, as PHEVs can travel considerably further in charge-sustaining mode which utilizes both fuel combustion and the on-board battery pack.

Calculating AER is made more complicated in PHEVs because of variations in drivetrain design.  A vehicle like the Fisker Karma that uses a serial hybrid design has a clear AER.  Similarly a vehicle like the Chevrolet Volt which disengages the internal combustion engine (ICE) from the drivetrain while in electric mode has a clear AER, however blend-mode PHEVs which use the ICE and electric motor in conjunction do not have a clear AER because they use both gasoline and electricity at the same time. Equivalent AER is the AER of vehicles following this architecture.  One example of this calculation can be found in Argonne National Labs report titled "TEST PROCEDURES AND BENCHMARKING Blended-Type and EV-Capable Plug-In Hybrid Electric Vehicles."

This procedure uses the formula below to calculate an equivalent AER for vehicles that operate in blended mode:

Where GPMCD designates efficiency in charge-depleting mode, and GPMCS charge-sustaining mode as designated and dCD is distance in charge depleting mode.

A plug-in hybrid's all-electric range is designated by PHEV-(miles) or PHEV-(kilometers) km representing the distance the vehicle can travel on battery power alone. For example, a PHEV-20 can travel 20 miles without using its internal combustion engine, or about 32 kilometers, so it may also be designated as PHEV32km.

See also
 Worldwide Harmonised Light Vehicles Test Procedure (WLTP)

References 

Electric vehicles